Goose Creek Township is a township in Piatt County, Illinois, USA.  As of the 2010 census, its population was 790 and it contained 355 housing units.

Ameren's Goose Creek Energy Center, a combustion turbine generator (CTG) power plant, is located in Goose Creek Township.

Geography

Cities and towns
 De Land

Extinct towns
 Combs

Adjacent townships
 Santa Anna Township, DeWitt County (north)
 Blue Ridge Township (northeast)
 Sangamon Township (east)
 Monticello Township (southeast)
 Willow Branch Township (south)
 Friends Creek Township, Macon County (southwest)
 Nixon Township, DeWitt County (west)
 DeWitt Township, DeWitt County (northwest)

Cemeteries
The township contains eight cemeteries: Deland, Dillow Family, Dooley Family, Kentuck, Marquiss, Morain, Mosgrove and Old Monticello.

Major highways
  Illinois State Route 10
  Illinois State Route 48

References

External links
 US-Counties.com
 City-Data.com
 Illinois State Archives
 U.S. Board on Geographic Names (GNIS)
 United States Census Bureau cartographic boundary files

Townships in Piatt County, Illinois
1859 establishments in Illinois
Populated places established in 1859
Townships in Illinois